Darren Jeffrey Chester (born 13 September 1967) is an Australian politician. He has been a member of the House of Representatives for Gippsland in Victoria, representing the Nationals since 2008. Chester had served as the Minister for Veterans' Affairs and the Minister for Defence Personnel between March 2018 and July 2021 in the Turnbull and Morrison Governments. He was also Minister Assisting the Prime Minister for the Centenary of ANZAC until May 2019.

Chester served as the Parliamentary Secretary to the Minister for Defence in the Abbott ministry from September 2013 to September 2015. In the Turnbull Government he was appointed Assistant Minister for Defence from 21 September 2015; and between 18 February 2016 and 20 December 2017, Chester served as the Minister for Infrastructure and Transport following a rearrangement in the First Turnbull Ministry. He briefly served in the Second Turnbull Ministry as the acting Minister for Regional Development and as the acting Minister for Local Government and Territories between October and December 2017, following the resignation of Fiona Nash.

Chester was viewed as a potential candidate to replace Barnaby Joyce as National Party leader in February 2018; however he chose not to contest the leadership.

Early life
Chester was born in Sale, Victoria, the son of a plumber, and was one of five children.

Prior to entering federal politics, he worked as a newspaper and television journalist throughout Gippsland and was chief of staff to Peter Ryan, the leader of the Nationals in the Victorian state parliament.

Politics

Early involvement
Chester contested Gippsland East as the National Party candidate at the 2002 Victorian state election, losing to independent Craig Ingram. In 2004, he unsuccessfully stood for National Party preselection for the Senate position held by Julian McGauran. McGauran retained his party endorsement and was re-elected later that year, only to defect to the Liberals in 2006.

House of Representatives
Chester was elected to the House of Representatives at the 2008 by-election caused by the resignation of Peter McGauran, and re-elected at the 2010 and 2013 elections.

He was appointed Shadow Parliamentary Secretary for Roads and Regional Transport in September 2010; and appointed as Parliamentary Secretary to the Minister for Defence in September 2013.

In June 2015 he became the first member of the National Party to announce support for same-sex marriage and a conscience vote on the issue for members of the Coalition. The move catalysed a public breakdown in Chester's relationship with his local Nationals branches in Gippsland, who moved a motion to revoke his party endorsement for the 2016 election. Chaotic scenes ensued at a Gippsland Nationals branch meeting where Chester was reported to have verbally abused local party members, with Chester subsequently attacking The Australian newspaper for its coverage of the controversy.

Public scrutiny of taxpayer-funded travel allowances usage by MPs has embroiled Chester in controversy. The Sydney Morning Herald revealed that between 2008 and 2016, Chester charged taxpayers $407,000 on private air charters to travel to Canberra for parliamentary sittings, despite most MPs using normal commercial air services or driving. On 27 January 2016, Chester charged taxpayers $876 for a work trip to Melbourne on which he completed the purchase of a two-bedroom apartment in Ivanhoe as an investment property and to later attended a Melbourne Victory soccer match.

During the ongoing leadership tensions between Barnaby Joyce and Michael McCormack after the former resigned in February 2018 and the latter became federal leader, Chester has been a prominent leader of the McCormack faction and was notably rewarded with a ministerial appointment when McCormack first become leader. He won a subsequent promotion to Cabinet after McCormack defeated a leadership challenge by Joyce in February 2020. It would later emerge in May 2020 during the recriminations over McCormack's refusal to support a planned run for federal parliament by NSW Deputy Premier John Barilaro in the 2020 Eden-Monaro by-election that Chester was in a WhatsApp group where messages about Barilaro and his wife were exchanged with colleagues Damian Drum and Kevin Hogan.

For supporting incumbent McCormack in the 2021 Nationals leadership spill, Chester was stripped of his ministerial portfolios by new leader Joyce.

Chester has been a frequent critic of Barnaby Joyce, labelling him ‘incoherent’, criticising his leadership style and scepticism of climate science.

Chester was comfortably re-elected at the 2022 Australian federal election.

Chester challenged incumbent Nationals Party leader Barnaby Joyce along with David Littleproud, the incumbent deputy leader in a three way race for the leadership of the party on Monday 30 May 2022, after the incumbent Liberal/National Coalition government lost office to the Labor opposition. The Nationals party room got bigger, however, their coalition partner suffered seat losses. Chester along with Joyce lost to Littleproud on that day. Chester was eventually not included in the subsequent shadow ministry. However, on 4 January 2023, he was appointed to the outer shadow ministry as Shadow Minister for Regional Education and Shadow Minister for Regional Development, Local Government and Territories.

Personal
Chester lives in Lakes Entrance, Victoria, with his wife, Julie, and their four children: Morgan, Jamieson, Lachlan, and Clancy.

References

External links
 Parliamentary biography
 First Speech to Parliament – Google Video
 First Speech to Parliament – Text
 

|-

|-

1967 births
Living people
National Party of Australia members of the Parliament of Australia
Members of the Australian House of Representatives
Members of the Australian House of Representatives for Gippsland
Abbott Government
Turnbull Government
Government ministers of Australia
People from Sale, Victoria
21st-century Australian politicians
Morrison Government